The 1998 Paris–Roubaix was the 96th running of the Paris–Roubaix single-day cycling race, often known as the Hell of the North. Franco Ballerini won the monument classic; his  team took all three podium positions.

Johan Museeuw, the winner of 1996, crashed heavily in the Trouée d'Arenberg pavé section, shattering his knee. On top of this came a dangerous gangrene infection which nearly spelled the end of his career.

Results
12-04-1998: Compiègne–Roubaix, 266.5 km.

References

1998
1998 in road cycling
1998 in French sport
1998 UCI Road World Cup
April 1998 sports events in Europe